Guadalcanal Campaign is a 1982 computer wargame developed by Gary Grigsby and published by Strategic Simulations, Inc. (SSI). It was Grigsby's first released game and has been cited as the first monster wargame made for computers.

Guadalcanal Campaign was a commercial and critical success that helped to establish Grigsby in the game industry. Grigsby followed it with Bomb Alley. Continuing to work with SSI, he went on to become a prominent name in the computer wargame field, releasing 23 games with the company by 1996.

Gameplay

Guadalcanal Campaign is a computer wargame that simulates the Solomon Islands campaign of World War II.

Development
Guadalcanal Campaign was the first game released by designer Gary Grigsby. He recalled beginning development in December 1981. In early 1982, while phoning Strategic Simulations' hotline about its game Torpedo Fire, he got into a conversation with company head Joel Billings that led to an offer to publish Guadalcanal Campaign. Grigsby said that he had "nearly completed a crude working version" by the time that he talked to Billings. Grigsby developed the game in his spare time at night while working a day job at the United States Department of Defense, an arrangement he called "incredibly hard". He later said that he had made "a lot of little fragments of games" before Guadalcanal Campaign, but that it was the first full project he had undertaken. Guadalcanal Campaign was released in 1982, after roughly 8 months of work.

Reception
Guadalcanal Campaign was a commercial success. According to Craig Ritchie of Retro Gamer, it sold roughly 3,500 copies, which he called "an outstanding figure for such a niche market".

Richard Charles Karr reviewed the game for Computer Gaming World, and stated that "It is this writer's opinion that Guadalcanal Campaign is the best historical simulation (and one of their best games) from SSI to date. The essential aspects of historicity and playability are well-matched, with easy accessibility of gaming information, a well-organized set of rules, and good research combining to provide for a game that will keep you at your computer for days at a time." Rich Sutton of Video Games called it "one of the best simulations available for beginner and expert alike".

Legacy
Guadalcanal Campaign has been cited by Computer Gaming World, Electronic Games and author Rusel DeMaria as the first monster wargame released for computers. According to Retro Gamer, it "set the standard for a long line of award-winning wargames to come." It helped to establish both Grigsby and SSI in the game industry; Grigsby himself went on to be one of the computer wargame genre's most respected contributors. He continued his relationship with SSI; by 1996, he had worked with the company on 23 games. In 2001, he co-founded the studio 2 by 3 Games with SSI's Joel Billings and Keith Brors, where they continued to work together on wargames such as War in the Pacific and Gary Grigsby's World at War.

References

External links

 Review in Casus Belli #14 (April 1983)
Review in Games magazine
Review in Tilt (French)

1982 video games
Apple II games
Apple II-only games
Computer wargames
Guadalcanal Campaign
Multiplayer and single-player video games
Pacific War video games
Strategic Simulations games
Turn-based strategy video games
Video games developed in the United States
Video games set in the Solomon Islands